Tamiami is a census-designated place (CDP) in Miami-Dade County, Florida, United States. The population was 54,212 at the 2020 census.

Name 
The name Tamiami is a portmanteau of the phrase "Tampa to Miami". The Tamiami Trail, a roadway that goes through the Everglades, connecting the two cities, was the reason for this combination.

Geography
It is bordered to the east by Sweetwater and Westchester, to the southeast by Westwood Lakes, and to the south by Kendale Lakes. U.S. Route 41, the Tamiami Trail, passes through the center of the community, leading east into Miami and west through the Everglades  to Naples.

Demographics

2020 census

As of the 2020 United States census, there were 54,212 people, 16,057 households, and 13,185 families residing in the CDP.

2010 census

As of 2010, there were 17,256 households, with 3.0% being vacant. As of 2000, 42.1% had children under the age of 18 living with them, 66.0% were married couples living together, 16.2% had a female householder with no husband present, and 12.6% were non-families. 9.4% of all households were made up of individuals, and 3.5% had someone living alone who was 65 years of age or older. The average household size was 3.33 and the average family size was 3.50.

2000 census
As of 2000, the CDP population was spread out, with 24.4% under the age of 18, 8.7% from 18 to 24, 30.0% from 25 to 44, 24.1% from 45 to 64, and 12.9% who were 65 years of age or older.  The median age was 37 years. For every 100 females, there were 90.4 males.  For every 100 females age 18 and over, there were 85.4 males.

As of 2000, the median income for a household in the CDP was $47,503, and the median income for a family was $49,763. Males had a median income of $30,716 versus $26,426 for females. The per capita income for the CDP was $17,601.  About 7.6% of families and 9.4% of the population were below the poverty line, including 12.0% of those under age 18 and 9.7% of those age 65 or over.

As of 2000, speakers of Spanish as a first language accounted for 92.39% of residents, while English was the mother tongue of 6.99% of the population. Other languages spoken were well below 1% of the population.

As of 2000, Tamiami had the seventh highest percentage of Cuban and Cuban American residents in the US, with 56.63% of the populace. Nicaraguans and Nicaraguan American made up the fifth highest percentage, at 4.66% of Tamiami residents. It had the thirty-second highest percentage of Colombian and Colombian American residents in the US, at 3.94% of the population, and the 105th highest percentage of Dominican and Dominican American residents in the US, at 1.53% of its population (tied with Ives Estates, FL, Adelphi, Maryland, and Dover, New Jersey.) It also had the eighteenth most Venezuelan and Venezuelan American residents in the US, at 1.06% of the population (tied with Miami Lakes.)

Education
Miami-Dade County Public Schools operates public schools. 

Elementary schools:
 Marjory Stoneman Douglas Elementary School
 Greenglade Elementary School
 Joe Hall Elementary School
 Zora Neale Hurston Elementary School
 Wesley Matthews Elementary School
 Village Green Elementary School

Middle schools:
 Paul W. Bell Middle School
 W. R. Thomas Middle School

The Roman Catholic Archdiocese of Miami operates Catholic schools. St. Kevin School is in Tamiami.It opened in August 1980. Belen Jesuit Preparatory School is also in Tamiami.

References

Census-designated places in Miami-Dade County, Florida
Census-designated places in Florida